Kiwanis International is an international service club founded in 1915 and found in more than 80 nations and geographic areas

Kiwanis may also refer to:

Places
Kiwanis Field, ballpark in Salem, Virginia 
Kiwanis Lake, lake located in Kiwanis Community Park in central Tempe, Arizona
Kiwanis Park, New Brunswick, Canada
Kiwanis Ravine, a public park in the Magnolia neighborhood of Seattle, Washington
Kiwanis Trail, a rail to trail conversion in Adrian, Michigan

Others
Kiwanis Music Festival, regional music competitions organized by Kiwanis service clubs

See also
Kiwan